Étude Op. 10, No. 11, in E major, is a technical study composed by Frédéric Chopin. It is sometimes known as the "Arpeggio" or "Guitar" Étude. The chief difficulty addressed in this piece is the performance of extended arpeggiated chords. Throughout, the hands are required to stretch intervals as large as twelfths. The melody, though usually the highest note of each chord, is often found in inner parts with higher parts simply being part of the accompaniment. This is especially the case in the final bars. The piece is also notable for its chromatic harmonies, daring at the time, and enharmonic shifts.

External links 
 
 Op. 10, No. 11 played by Alfred Cortot
 Op. 10, No. 11 played by Claudio Arrau
 Op. 10, No. 11 played by Vladimir Ashkenazy
 Op. 10, No. 11 played by Maurizio Pollini

10 11
1830 compositions
Compositions in E-flat major